Timbuktu is a 2014 Mauritanian-French drama film directed and co-written by Abderrahmane Sissako. The film centres on the brief occupation of Timbuktu, Mali by Ansar Dine, and is partially influenced by the 2012 public stoning of an unmarried couple in Aguelhok. Shot in Oualata, Mauritania, Timbuktu was selected to compete for the Palme d'Or in the main competition section at the 2014 Cannes Film Festival, where it won the Prize of the Ecumenical Jury and the François Chalais Prize. Timbuktu was chosen as Mauritania's submission for the Academy Award for Best Foreign Language Film, and went on to be nominated for the prize at the 87th Academy Awards; it was also nominated for the BAFTA Award for Best Film Not in the English Language at the 69th British Academy Film Awards. Timbuktu was named Best Film at the 11th Africa Movie Academy Awards, where it was nominated for ten further awards. In 2017, The New York Times ranked it the 12th best film of the 21st century so far.

Plot
The film explores the denizens of the city of Timbuktu in central Mali following the city's occupation by extremist Islamists bearing a jihadist black flag. The jihadists enforce a strict interpretation of sharia, including passing sentences of lashes for playing football, singing and being in non-familial mixed-sex settings; and stoning for adultery. The Islam of the jihadists is noted to be in contrast to the Islam preached by the local imam. Kidane, a Tuareg cattle herder, lives outside the city with his wife Satima and daughter Toya. One of his cows damages the net of Amadou, a fisherman, who subsequently kills it. Kidane, armed with a pistol, confronts Amadou, and accidentally shoots him dead. The jihadists arrest Kidane but offer to spare his life if Amadou's family forgive him and he pays diya of forty cattle. Toya and her friend Issan are able to gather enough cattle, but Amadou's family decline to forgive Kidane, and the death sentence is passed. With the support of a motorcyclist, Satima arrives at the execution and as she and Kidane run to each other, the executioners gun them down. The jihadists chase the motorcyclist into the desert, while Toya is seen running, closely followed by Issan.

Cast
 Ibrahim Ahmed dit Pino as Kidane
 Toulou Kiki as Satima
 Layla Walet Mohamed as Toya
 Mehdi Ag Mohamed as Issan
 Kettly Noel as Zabou
 Abel Jafri as Abdelkerim
 Hichem Yacoubi as a jihadist 
 Fatoumata Diawara as Fatou 
 Omar Haidara as Amadou
 Damien Ndjie as Abu Jaafar

Themes
Throughout the film, subsidiary scenes show the reactions of Timbuktu's residents to the jihadist rule. A female fishmonger is made to wear gloves whilst selling fish; a woman is taken overnight and forcibly married after her family decline a jihadists' offer of marriage; a woman is lashed for singing and for being in the company of men not in her family; a couple are stoned to death for adultery.

The film acknowledges the failure of the jihadists to live up to their own rules. Abdelkerim hides his smoking but it is common knowledge among his fellow occupiers; football is banned but a group of French jihadists are seen discussing their favourite football players.

They are also observed to be less knowledgable and secure in their convictions; they do not know how to respond when a woman is found singing, but in praise of Allah, nor when local men play football with an imaginary ball. In conversations with the local imam, the jihadists cherrypick aspects of sharia law in order to justify their actions. When attempting to make a propaganda video, a jihadist admits he lacks conviction in what he is saying.

The characters speak Arabic, French, Tamasheq, Bambara, and English, as noted in the constant use of translation and interpretation on the jihadists' parts to aid them in enshrining their interpretation of sharia to the city. The traditional ways of life are interspersed with the modern, such as characters, even the nomadic Tuareg in the desert, communicating by mobile phones; the jihadists recording propaganda with a camera and lamp.

Production
The film, Sissako's fifth, was inspired by the true story of a young, unmarried couple, who were stoned to death by Islamists in Aguelhok, a rural region in eastern Mali. Sissako originally wanted to make a film about slavery in Mauritania, but this storyline was deemed unacceptable by the country's president, Mohamed Ould Abdel Aziz. Sissako agreed to instead make a film on jihadists, with the support of the Mauritanian government, who provided financial and human resources to the filmmaker. Sissako had initially intended to film in Timbuktu, but resorted to Mauritania after a suicide bomber attacked a checkpoint near the city's airport.

Reception

Critical reception
On Rotten Tomatoes, the film has a 98% approval rating and an average rating of 8.80/10 based on 122 reviews. The website's critical consensus reads: "Gracefully assembled and ultimately disquieting, Timbuktu is a timely film with a powerful message."  It also received a score of 92 out of 100 on Metacritic, based on 31 critics, indicating "universal acclaim". According to both Metacritic and Rotten Tomatoes,  Timbuktu is the best reviewed foreign-language film of 2015.

Jay Weissberg of Variety writes: "In the hands of a master, indignation and tragedy can be rendered with clarity yet subtlety, setting hysteria aside for deeper, more richly shaded tones. Abderrahmane Sissako is just such a master." In a review for The Daily Telegraph, Tim Robey suggested it was a "wrenching tragic fable, Aesop-like in its moral clarity." He went on to say it was "full of life, irony, poetry and bitter unfairness."

In the Financial Times, Nigel Andrews called it "skilful, sardonic, honourably humane." Reviewing it for The Guardian, Jonathan Romney called it, "witty, beautiful and even, sobering though it is, highly entertaining" as well as "mischievous and imaginative." He concluded that it was "a formidable statement of resistance."

Sight & Sounds Nick Pinkerton says "The fact remains that there are few filmmakers alive today wearing a mantle of moral authority comparable to that which Sissako has taken upon himself, and if his film has been met with an extraordinary amount of acclaim, it is because he manages to wear this mantle lightly, and has not confused drubbing an audience with messages with profundity. I can’t imagine the film having been made any other way, by anyone else – and this is one measure of greatness."

Accolades
Following its premiere at the 2014 Cannes Film Festival, Timbuktu won two awards; the Prize of the Ecumenical Jury and the François Chalais Prize. The film won the New York Film Critics Circle Award for Best Foreign Language Film and the National Society of Film Critics Award for Best Foreign Language Film, and was nominated for the Academy Award for Best Foreign Language Film and the BAFTA Award for Best Film Not in the English Language. In 2016, it was voted the 36th best film of the 21st century as picked by 177 film critics from around the world.

At the 11th Africa Movie Academy Awards, Timbuktu won the most prizes with five, including for Best Film, Best Director (for Sissako), Best Child Actor (for Walet Mohammed and Mohammed), Best Film in an African Language, and Achievement in Editing; in total, the film received 11 nominations.

See also
 List of submissions to the 87th Academy Awards for Best Foreign Language Film
 List of Mauritanian submissions for the Academy Award for Best Foreign Language Film

References

External links
 
 
 
 

2014 films
2014 drama films
2010s French-language films
Best Film César Award winners
Best Film Lumières Award winners
Films directed by Abderrahmane Sissako
Films set in 2012
Films set in Mali
Films shot in Mauritania
Films whose director won the Best Director César Award
Films whose director won the Best Director Lumières Award
French drama films
Mauritanian drama films
Tamashek-language films
Timbuktu in popular culture
2010s French films